The 2010–11 season was Viktoria Plzeň's sixth consecutive season in the Czech First League. Having won the Czech Cup, they entered the competition as defending champions. They also took part in the inaugural Czech Supercup and played in the UEFA Europa League for the first time in their history.

Plzeň started the season by losing to AC Sparta Prague by a 1–0 scoreline in the first ever Czech Supercup. Later in July the club played its first ever fixture in the Europa League, drawing 1–1 with Turkish side Beşiktaş in the third qualifying round of the competition. Their European run was to be short-lived as the Turkish club won 3–0 in the return leg, sending Plzeň out of the competition, 4–1 on aggregate.

Despite being the defending champions of the Czech Cup, the club could only reach the quarter final stage, where they suffered a 4–2 aggregate loss to fellow Gambrinus liga side Mladá Boleslav. In the Czech First League, the club celebrated their first title as they won the league by a single point from second-placed Sparta Prague.

Czech First League

Results summary

League table

Results by round

Matches

July

August

September

October

November

February

March

April

May

Last updated: 27 June 2013Source: iDnes.cz, gambrinusliga.cz

Czech Cup 

As a Gambrinus liga team, Plzeň entered the Czech Cup at the second round stage. In the second round, they comfortably overcame home side Baník Most by a 4–1 scoreline. The third round match at Vlašim was another comfortable game, with Plzeň emerging 2–0 winners. Over two legs, Plzeň defeated Opava by a 6–3 aggregate scoreline in the fourth round; having won the home leg 3–0, a 3–3 draw was enough for the team to progress to the next round. In the quarter finals, up against Gambrinus liga competition for the first time in the form of Mladá Boleslav, Plzeň lost both matches 2–1 and therefore went out of the competition 4–2 on aggregate.

Czech Supercup 
As winners of the previous season's Czech Cup, Plzeň played defending league champions Sparta Prague in the Czech Supercup on 8 July. It was the first edition of the competition. Both teams had a player sent off in the match; Sparta won the match by a single goal.

UEFA Europa League 

Plzeň entered the UEFA Europa League in the third qualifying round, due to having won the 2009–10 Czech Cup. In their first match, they faced Turkish opponents Beşiktaş, drawing 1–1 in the Czech Republic but subsequently losing 3–0 in Turkey, thus losing 4–1 on aggregate.

Note 1: Played in Prague at Generali Arena as Viktoria Plzeň's Stadion města Plzně did not meet UEFA criteria.

References

External links 
Official Website

Viktoria Plzen
2010-11
Czech Republic football championship-winning seasons